The Family History Research Wiki (also known as the FamilySearch Research Wiki or the FamilySearch Wiki) provides handbook reference information, and educational articles to help genealogists find and interpret records of their ancestors.  It is a free-access, free-content, online encyclopedia on a wiki, hosted as part of the FamilySearch site. It is sponsored by FamilySearch, a non-profit organization, and a genealogical arm of the Church of Jesus Christ of Latter-day Saints. Anyone may read any of the over 91,000 articles, and almost all articles can be edited by registered users (contributors); registration is free.

Content 

Most of the articles in this Wiki are about a place such as a town, county, state, province, or nation. Such articles suggest how to research records for information about ancestors in that jurisdiction. Every nation worldwide has at least one article. There are more articles for places in the United States, Canada, and Europe. So far, there are comparatively fewer pages for Africa, Asia, Australia, Latin America, or the Pacific Islands.

Contributors are invited to add any information about places to help researchers find, use, or better understand an ancestor's records. For example, information about local record idiosyncrasies, record gaps or record-loss, jurisdictional boundary changes, records housed in unusual places, or tips for using the records more effectively, is encouraged. Reference information about local jurisdictions, contact information, record start and stop dates, repositories, social life and customs that affected local record keeping are also welcome.

Content for a place-article may include maps, primary repository contact information, organization date, parent jurisdiction, internal sub-divisions such as towns or counties, boundary changes, record loss if any, neighboring localities, resources, local record types, local migration routes, and other local libraries, archives, societies, or museums.

Other types of pages in Family History Research Wiki are about:
record types (like census, church, land, or vital records): descriptions, how to find them, and how to interpret them
short articles describing how to use a specific source like the Hamburg Passenger Lists, or Ontario Land Records
articles that explain how to corroborate similar multiple sources such as Tracing Immigrant Origins or U.S. military records
finding aids about specific reference tools and how to use them effectively
ethnic, religious, or political groups research
descriptions of significant repositories: libraries, archives, societies, museums, or Family History Centers with material of value to genealogical researchers
how to use selected genealogical software programs
research methodology—teaching the strategies or techniques for finding ancestors
migration routes like ports, rivers, canals, trails, roads, and railroads and their associated records
20 foreign-language word lists which give English translations of phrases typically found in genealogical documents
letter-writing guides to help researchers write letters in foreign languages to local record repositories
handwriting guides help readers understand old forms of handwriting or foreign alphabets
calendar information which might be listed in some genealogical documents, for example Fixed and Moveable Feast Days for Sweden
blank genealogical forms such as family group records or pedigree charts
links to thousands of significant genealogical databases online
links to video lessons about how-to-do genealogical research
illustrations in articles frequently include maps, clickable maps, repository images, flags, and record type examples

The Family History Research Wiki is not a database of ancestors' names, photos, family stories, or pedigrees. Nor is it a place for genealogical queries, or message boards—however, it often explains and then links to such sites. Advertising, or product reviews would be inappropriate. Religious doctrines, church policies, and religious images do not belong on the Family History Research Wiki except where they directly impact genealogical research.

Content history
The Family History Library in Salt Lake City has over four thousand branches worldwide called Family History Centers. These centers have volunteer staff who offer free research advice to visitors. To help these volunteers better answer questions about research, a series of "research outlines" and other publications by the Family History Library were developed starting about 1988. When the Family History Research Wiki was launched in late 2007, the electronic copies of the old paper publications of the Family History Library were immediately transferred into the wiki to become part of over 162 new articles. Of those articles, 86 were front-page-articles each linked to about 25 closely related topical sub-pages. For example, the front-page New Jersey Genealogy article was linked directly to the associated New Jersey Biography, New Jersey Cemeteries, and New Jersey Census pages, among others. Much of the early structure and phrasing of the wiki can be attributed to these publications. The old paper "research outlines" were the original kernel from which the Family History Research Wiki has grown.

Platform history
The Family History Research Wiki was launched 14 December 2007 when the main page was first edited. The wiki began on Plone wiki software. However, it was soon discovered that MediaWiki software would be a better platform, so in January 2008 it was moved to the MediaWiki 1.17.1. In late March 2016, it was moved to a newer, more-stable Wiki platform, WikiMedia 1.23.10, which does not require as much attention from FamilySearch computer engineers.

Languages
Following the English language edition introduction in late 2007, the Family History Research Wiki has been rolled out in other languages. As of July 2014 it is available in 11 languages:
English
Deutsch (German)
Español (Spanish)
Français (French)
Italiano (Italian)
日本語 (Japanese)
한국어 (Korean)
Português (Portuguese)
Русский (Russian)
Svenska (Swedish)
中文 (Chinese)
Links to the other language wikis are found at the bottom of the Family History Research Wiki homepage. As of 7 March 2016, the Family History Research Wiki in English had 150,561 registered users who had helped create over 82,858 articles.

Reception
The Family History Research Wiki has over 100 million views per year. During most months it is usually the second-most frequently visited part (out of ten parts) of FamilySearch, its host site. Wider use of this wiki in the genealogical community seems to be growing only slowly. This resource has been discussed by expert how-to-book authors, in periodicals, by instructors at genealogical conferences and classes, on Internet sites, in blogs, and on talk radio.

James Tanner in 2014 on his Genealogy Star blog said the Family History Research Wiki ". . . is the one most valuable genealogical resource on the Web. I make no qualification in making that claim and have repeated it time and time again."

Christine Hitchmough in her 2016 lesson "FamilySearch: Using the Wiki" explained "Because no one can be an expert in all localities, records, languages, or ethnic groups, the purpose of the FamilySearch Wiki is to collaborate and share knowledge that is designed to encourage and eventually enable all people, anywhere in the world, to know where to find, how to use, and how to analyze genealogy records."

The Federation of Genealogical Societies in 2014 used their blogtalkradio hour "mysociety" to explain how to leverage a society's Internet site by adding a Family History Research Wiki article linking to their society home page.

The London FamilySearch Centre in the Reading Room at the National Archives near Kew Gardens, England wrote in March 2015, "The Research Wiki is a work in progress. It relies on members from the genealogical community to help add information to make it grow. YOU are the genealogical community! You may know of a database or information not already listed in the wiki."

Governance
The Wiki Governance Council oversees the direction and management of the Family History Research Wiki. Its purpose is to facilitate a valuable and productive experience for all Wiki users.

References

External links
FamilySearch Research Wiki

American genealogy websites
Collaborative projects
Creative Commons-licensed websites
Internet properties established in 2007
Multilingual websites
Open content projects
Wikis
Wikis about geography
Genealogy and the Church of Jesus Christ of Latter-day Saints